Leinesfjord or Myklebostad is the administrative centre of the municipality of Steigen in Nordland county, Norway. The local school is located here as well as Leinesfjord Chapel.

References

Steigen
Villages in Nordland
Populated places of Arctic Norway